Akourousoulba or Akoursoulbak is a village in the Bamingui-Bangoran Prefecture in the northern Central African Republic.

History 

Akourousoulba used to be a stronghold of Popular Front for the Rebirth of Central African Republic armed group. Abdoulaye Hissène, one of leaders of FPRC was born there. On 22 August 2022 Russian mercenaries from Wagner Group arrived in Akourousoulba, looting shops, before withdrawing the next day. On 2 September CPC rebels attacked the town. After day of heavy fighting rebels managed to expel armed forces from Akourousoulba before withdrawing on 4 September.

References

External links
Satellite map at Maplandia.com

Populated places in Bamingui-Bangoran
N'Délé